The siege of Athlone was part of the Williamite War in Ireland between the supporters of King James II, who were known as Jacobites, and the supporters of King William of Orange. The siege began on July 17, 1690 when Williamite Lieutenant-General James Douglas arrived outside the Jacobite held city of Athlone with ten regiments of foot and five regiments of horse for a total force of 12,000. The Governor of Athlone, Colonel Richard Grace decided to defend the western part of the city. The Jacobite troops destroyed the bridge over the Shannon River that connected the eastern and western parts of the city, before the Williamite Army arrived. The city's garrison consisted of three regiments of foot and eleven troops of horse for a total force of about 4,500.

General Douglas sent a messenger to Colonel Grace demanding he surrender the city. Colonel Grace responded by firing a pistol shot over the head of the messenger and stating "These are my terms; these only, I will give or receive, and when my provisions are consumed, I will defend till I eat my old boots." General Douglas commenced a bombardment of the city with twelve cannon and two mortars, the city of Athlone's guns returned fire. After two days the Williamite Army attempted to ford the Shannon River but were repelled with considerable loss. The artillery fire continued between the two sides until July 24 when General Douglas was forced to retire having suffered about 400 casualties, and having been informed that Patrick Sarsfield and the Jacobite Cavalry were en route to relieve the city of Athlone's garrison.

Although the Jacobites withstood the week long siege, a year later the Williamite Army returned and took the city. Governor Richard Grace died defending the city during the 2nd siege of Athlone in 1691.

References 

 O'Callaghan, John, History of The Irish Brigades in the Service of France, Cameron & Ferguson, 1870
 Blake-Forster, Charles, The Irish Chieftains; or, A Struggle for the Crown, McGlashan & Gill, 1872
 "The Siege of Limerick (1690)" from A Concise History of Ireland by P. W. Joyce. LibraryIreland.com

External links 
 Colonel Richard Grace at LibraryIreland.com

Battles of the Williamite War in Ireland
Conflicts in 1690
Sieges involving Ireland
1690 in Ireland